Vincent Die Foneye (born July 15, 1979) is a retired Ivorian footballer, who plays as a striker for the Egyptian team ENPPI.

Career
Dié Fonéyé began playing football with local side Stella Club d'Adjamé, where he helped the club gain promotion to the first division. Midway through the following season, he joined rival first division side ASEC Mimosas, where he would win four league titles and three cup titles.

References

External links
Player profile - Sports.FilBalad.com

1979 births
Living people
Ivorian footballers
Ivorian expatriates in Egypt
Association football forwards
ASEC Mimosas players
Expatriate footballers in Egypt
Stella Club d'Adjamé players
ENPPI SC players
Haras El Hodoud SC players